Kaliyugaya (Sinhala, Age of Darkness) is a novel written by Sinhala writer Martin Wickremasinghe and first published in 1957. It is the second book of Wickremasinghe's trilogy that started with Gamperaliya - transformation of a village. The final book of the trilogy is Yuganthaya (culmination of the era).

It was adapted into a movie by Lester James Peries in 1981.

The story depicts the lives of Nanda and Piyal after marriage and their children.

1957 novels
Sri Lankan novels
Novels set in Sri Lanka
Sri Lankan novels adapted into films
Novels by Martin Wickramasinghe